Line Haugsted (born 11 November 1994) is a Danish handball player for Győri ETO KC and the Danish national team.

On 30 January 2022, it was announced that Haugsted had signed a 2-year contract with Győri ETO KC.

She made her debut on the Danish national team on 28 November 2014, against Norway. She participated at the 2016 European Women's Handball Championship in Sweden.

Achievements
Danish Championship:
Silver Medalist: 2021
Bronze Medalist: 2018, 2020
Women's EHF European League:
Finalist: 2022

Individual awards
 All-Star Best Defense Player of the European Championship: 2020
 Youth player of the Year in Damehåndboldligaen: 2012/13

References

External links

1994 births
Living people
Danish female handball players
People from Skive Municipality
Viborg HK players
FCM Håndbold players
Sportspeople from the Central Denmark Region
21st-century Danish women